The 62nd Armored Field Artillery Battalion was formed in 1942 at Fort Bliss, Texas. The 62nd served in the campaigns in North Africa, Sicily, and Europe. They received a unit citation for their activities on D-Day at Omaha Beach. Elements of the unit were transported ashore by USS LCT-209. On 17 December 1944 the 62nd Armored Field Artillery Battalion destroyed a column of roughly 40 German tanks and support vehicles at the Battle of Elsenborn Ridge.

References

External links
 Resources on the battalion
 Gallery
  After Action Report
  62nd in North Africa
  62nd in Sicily
  Jerry Eades - "My Life in the Army, 1936–1940"
  Jerry Eades - "Eades and Other's Stories"

References
 MacDonald, Charles B. (1985), A Time for Trumpets, The Untold Story of the Battle of the Bulge, William Morrow and Company, Inc., 

062
Military units and formations established in 1942
Military units and formations disestablished in 1945